Moj golube ("My dove") is a well-known folk song from countries of the former Yugoslavia.

References

Serbian folk songs